St. Sava Academy is a Serbian-American private school located in the city of Chicago Illinois, United States. The school offers schooling for children in Kindergarten to the 8th grade. The school is in cooperation with the Serbian Orthodox Church, and seeks to promote bilingual education and cultural growth to the city's Serbian community. Instruction is in Serbian and English.

The school was established in 2001, originally being in a union with the Greek-American School "Socrates".

There is another Serbian-American day school, the St. Sava Orthodox School, in Milwaukee.

See also
St. Sava Orthodox School
Serbian American Museum St. Sava
Serbian Americans

References

External links
 School website

Private elementary schools in Chicago
Private middle schools in Illinois
Private elementary schools in Illinois
Serbian-American culture in Illinois
Serbian schools outside Serbia
Educational institutions established in 2001
Education in Chicago
2001 establishments in Illinois